Dentate may refer to:

 A species having dentition
 An energy-dissipating baffle block in a spillway
 An individual not being edentulous
 Dentate gyrus of the hippocampus
 Dentate nucleus of the cerebellum
 Denticity in chemistry 
 Dentate leaf, a kind of leaf margin
 Dentate wing, a wing shape on Lepidoptera species

See also 
 Denticulate (disambiguation)